The 1983 SMU Mustangs football team represented Southern Methodist University (SMU) as a member of the Southwest Conference (SWC) during the 1983 NCAA Division I-A football season. Led by second-year head coach Bobby Collins, the Mustangs compiled an overall record 10–2 with a mark of 7–1 in conference play, placing second in the SWC. SMU was invited to the Sun Bowl, there they lost to Alabama.

Schedule

Roster

References

SMU
SMU Mustangs football seasons
SMU Mustangs football